Declaration of Independence is a  oil-on-canvas painting by the American artist John Trumbull depicting the presentation of the draft of the Declaration of Independence to Congress. It was based on a much smaller version of the same scene, presently held by the Yale University Art Gallery. Trumbull painted many of the figures in the picture from life, and visited Independence Hall to depict the chamber where the Second Continental Congress met. The oil-on-canvas work was commissioned in 1817, purchased in 1819, and placed in the United States Capitol rotunda in 1826.

The painting is sometimes incorrectly described as depicting the signing of the Declaration of Independence. The painting shows the five-man drafting committee presenting their draft of the Declaration to the Congress, an event that took place on June 28, 1776, and not its signing, which took place mainly on August 2.

The painting shows 42 of the 56 signers of the Declaration; Trumbull originally intended to include all 56 signers but was unable to obtain likenesses for all of them. He also depicted several participants in the debate who did not sign the document, including John Dickinson, who declined to sign. Trumbull had no portrait of Benjamin Harrison V to work with, but his son Benjamin Harrison VI was said to resemble his father, so Trumbull painted him instead. Similarly, Trumbull painted Rufus Hopkins, who resembled his father Stephen Hopkins, for whom no portrait was available. As the Declaration was debated and signed over a period of time when membership in Congress changed, the men featured in the painting never were in the same room at the same time.

Although Thomas Jefferson appears to be stepping on John Adams' shoe in the painting, which many thought symbolized their relationship as friendly rivals, upon closer examination it can be seen that their feet are merely close together. This part of the image was correctly depicted on the two-dollar bill version.

On the farthest wall hangs a display of trumpets, drum, and regimental colours captured from British regiments. This is not depicted in all versions, most notably the one seen on the two-dollar bill.

Key to historical figures depicted in the painting

The key to the 47 figures in the painting follows the numbering used by the U.S. government publication "Art of the Capitol" (in the illustration of the key shown in this section) but provides a different (hopefully clearer) description of which figure is where in the painting, so numbers are not entirely in order.

Key to figures (in each group, listed from left to right):

Four men seated on the far left:
1. George Wythe
2. William Whipple
3. Josiah Bartlett
5. Thomas Lynch Jr.

Seated at the table on the left:
4. Benjamin Harrison

Seated together to the right of Harrison and in front of the standing figures:
6. Richard Henry Lee
7. Samuel Adams
8. George Clinton

Five figures standing together on the left:
9. William Paca
10. Samuel Chase
11. Lewis Morris 
12. William Floyd
13. Arthur Middleton

Three seated figures in the back between the two sets of standing figures:
14. Thomas Heyward Jr.
15. Charles Carroll
16. George Walton

Set of three figures standing together in the back:
23. Stephen Hopkins (wearing a hat)
24. William Ellery
25. George Clymer

Ten figures seated:
17. Robert Morris (first on the left at the table)
18. Thomas Willing
19. Benjamin Rush
20. Elbridge Gerry
21. Robert Treat Paine
22. Abraham Clark
26. William Hooper
27. Joseph Hewes
28. James Wilson
29. Francis Hopkinson

Five figures standing in front (the Committee of Five):
30. John Adams
31. Roger Sherman
32. Robert R. Livingston
33. Thomas Jefferson
34. Benjamin Franklin

Four background figures seated together near the right corner of the room:
35. Richard Stockton
36. Francis Lewis
37. John Witherspoon
38. Samuel Huntington

Two figures standing in the right corner of the room:
39. William Williams
40. Oliver Wolcott

Two foreground figures at the central table:
42. Charles Thomson (standing)
41. John Hancock (seated)

Three figures standing at right:
43. George Read
44. John Dickinson
45. Edward Rutledge

Two figures seated at far right:
46. Thomas McKean
47. Philip Livingston
(Note:  - Not a signer of the final Declaration of Independence but depicted in painting.  Although Charles Thomson was one of two members listed by name in the earlier Dunlap Broadside as having attested to the Declaration, and many historians believe he had signed the original document that was lost. Clinton was not present at the signing of the Declaration.)

Unpainted signers
There were 14 signers of the Declaration who did not appear in the painting:
Matthew Thornton (New Hampshire)
John Hart (New Jersey)
John Morton (Pennsylvania)
James Smith (Pennsylvania)
George Taylor (Pennsylvania)
George Ross (Pennsylvania)
Caesar Rodney (Delaware)
Thomas Stone (Maryland)
Thomas Nelson, Jr. (Virginia)
Francis Lightfoot Lee (Virginia)
Carter Braxton (Virginia)
John Penn (North Carolina)
Button Gwinnett (Georgia)
Lyman Hall (Georgia)

On U.S. currency and postage stamps

Trumbull's Declaration of Independence signing scene painting has been depicted several times on United States currency and postage stamps. It was first used on the reverse side of the $100 National Bank Note that was issued in 1863. The depiction was engraved by Frederick Girsch of the American Bank Note Company. The same steel engraving was used on the 24¢ stamp issued six years later as part of the 1869 pictorial series of definitive U.S. postage stamps.

Trumbull's painting is presently depicted on the reverse of the two-dollar bill. Featured in it are 40 of the 47 figures from Trumbull's painting.  Cut out from the scene are: the farthest four figures on the left—George Wythe, William Whipple, Josiah Bartlett, and Thomas Lynch, Jr.; the farthest two figures on the right—Thomas McKean and Philip Livingston; and one of three figures seated in the left rear—George Walton. Additionally, two unrecognized figures were added: one in between Samuel Chase and Lewis Morris and another between James Wilson and Francis Hopkinson, bringing the total number of figures shown in this presentation scene to 42.

Other versions

Trumbull painted a smaller version (only ) entitled The Declaration of Independence, July 4, 1776 (1786–1820) that is now on view at the Yale University Art Gallery in New Haven, Connecticut.

Legacy and interpretations
In 2017, the company Ancestry.com restaged the painting with the 29 living descendants of the men depicted in Trumbull's painting as part of an advertising campaign called “Declaration Descendants". The campaign included two short films and ran on digital and social media platforms.  Shannon Lanier, a descendant of Thomas Jefferson, said: “When you see the new picture, the new image, it’s a picture of diverse people. Black, white, Hispanic, Native American—a little bit of everything—Asian, and that’s more of a representation of this country.”

In the 2008 HBO miniseries John Adams, in one of the final scenes of the series, the painter John Trumbull is showing his massive mural to an elderly John Adams for his approval. While staring at the painting Adams mentions, "They're all dead ... except me and Jefferson." He then expresses to Trumbull his disapproval of the work. This leads to a brief argument between the men about the difference between artistic license and historical accuracy. The scene itself is entirely fictional, but serves as a warning towards the fictionalization of the past itself with Adams stating "It is very bad history".

See also
Congress Voting Independence, a similar painting by Robert Edge Pine, 1784-1788
Declaration of Independence Tablet, Boston Common
Scene at the Signing of the Constitution of the United States – a 1940 painting depicting members of the 1787 Constitutional Convention by Howard Chandler Christy.
 Founding Fathers of the United States
 Syng inkstand, pictured in the painting

References

External links
Keys to the figures
Another key to the figures
Declaration of Independence Flash - based key

Other
A web page with some information on the painting
Architect of the Capitol Web page on the painting

Paintings about the American Revolution
Paintings by John Trumbull
1810s paintings
United States Declaration of Independence
Paintings in the United States Capitol
Musical instruments in art
Books in art
Flags in art
Cultural depictions of John Adams
Cultural depictions of Benjamin Franklin
Cultural depictions of Thomas Jefferson
Cultural depictions of Samuel Adams
United States Declaration of Independence in art